The Fox Valley—also commonly known as the Fox River Valley—is a region centered on the Fox River of Northern Illinois, along the western edges of the Chicago metropolitan area. The region extends from the village of Antioch, in far northern Illinois, to the city of Ottawa in the south. It includes rural areas, suburban development, and 19th-century downtowns. Around 1 million people live in this area.

Native American tribes that historically lived in this region include the Potawatomi, Sac, and Fox tribes.

Some of cities in the Fox River Valley are part of the Rust Belt. Within this region is Aurora, the second largest city in the state, Elgin, and the nearby cities of Batavia, St. Charles, and Geneva, which have been known as the Tri-City area since the early 20th century.

Prominent cities
The following is a list of cities and villages from north to south, along the Fox River Valley:

 Antioch
 Fox Lake
 Johnsburg
 McHenry
 Fox River Grove
 Cary
 Algonquin
 Carpentersville
 East Dundee
 West Dundee
 Elgin
 South Elgin
 Wayne
 Campton Hills
 St. Charles
 Geneva
 Batavia
 North Aurora
 Aurora
 Montgomery
 Oswego
 Yorkville
 Millbrook
 Millington
 Sheridan
 Ottawa

Notes

Chicago metropolitan area
Regions of Illinois
River valleys of the United States
Valleys of Illinois